Redcar and Cleveland College is a further education college, based in Redcar, North Yorkshire, England. The college offers apprenticeship training as well as A-level, vocational and higher education courses.

It is part of the Education Training Collective (Etc.), including Stockton Riverside College, Bede Sixth Form College, NETA Training and The Skills Academy.

The college is situated on the A1085 between Westfield and West Dyke, and very near Redcar Central railway station. It is in the Coatham part of Redcar.

History

Grammar schools
Historically, the campus began as the Sir William Turner's Grammar School in Coatham. Sir William Turner left money to form a school in Kirkleatham in 1709, which was rebuilt on Coatham Road in 1868. In 1963 it moved to buildings on Corporation Road, opposite the current college. The boys' grammar school and the Cleveland Grammar School for Girls, on Redcar Lane, went comprehensive in 1975, with both sixth forms merging to form the Sir William Turner's Sixth-Form College located on Redcar Lane. The girls' grammar school became Rye Hills School. The original school charity was the Sir William Turner Foundation.

College merger
In 1994, the sixth form college moved back to Corporation Road and merged with Cleveland Technical College to form the current college.

In 2018, the college merged with Stockton Riverside College. As part of the merger both colleges maintained their name and identities in their respective local communities.

In 2019 the Group changed its name to the Education Training Collective to more accurately reflect the diversity of all of its campuses while still maintaining all of the individual college names.

Former campuses
The main college was the Corporation Road Campus of the College. The Connections Campus was on Redcar Lane (B1269), at the southern end of Redcar Racecourse. This site was planned to become 187 new houses. The Loftus Campus was in the Centre of Opportunity & Partnership on High Street in Loftus, North Yorkshire.

Notable former pupils

Sir William Turner's Sixth Form College
 Stephen Grainger, Chief Executive from 2004-11 of the Youth Sport Trust

Sir William Turner's Grammar School

 Ian Bancroft, Baron Bancroft CB (of Coatham in the county of Cleveland), President from 1987–93 of the Building Centre Trust
 John Baycroft, bishop
 Frank Brenchley CMG, Ambassador from 1972–74 to Poland, and from 1968–72 to Norway 
 Sir George Malcolm Brown FRS, geologist, Director from 1979-85 of the British Geological Survey
 Sir Steve Bullock
 Paul Daniels, magician
 Prof Harry Elderfield FRS, Professor of Ocean Geochemistry and Palaeochemistry from 1999-2010 at the University of Cambridge, and 2003 winner of the Geological Society of London's Lyell Medal
 Sir Rex Hunt CMG, Commander-in-Chief from 1980–85 of the Falkland Islands 
 Alan Keen, Labour MP from 1992-2011 for Feltham and Heston 
 John Lister CBE, chief executive from 1987–89 of British Shipbuilders 
 Raymond Pennock, Baron Pennock (of Norton in the county of Cleveland), President from 1978–79 of the Chemical Industries Association (CIA), and from 1980–82 of the Confederation of British Industry (CBI), and Chairman from 1980–84 of BICC plc 
 Sir Thomas Rapp CMG, Ambassador from 1947–50 to Mexico 
 Sir Robert Stopford, Bishop of London from 1961–73
 Donald Tyerman CBE, Editor from 1956–65 of The Economist 
 Tim Williamson, footballer
 Roger Woolhouse, philosopher

External links
 Redcar & Cleveland College website
 Sir William Turner's School, Coatham
 EduBase

News items
 Arson in March 2003

Video clips
 RCC YouTube channel

Education in Redcar and Cleveland
Further education colleges in North Yorkshire
Educational institutions established in 1994
1994 establishments in England
Buildings and structures in Redcar and Cleveland
Redcar